Steel Hawg is an orange and black roller coaster located at Indiana Beach, Monticello, Indiana. The ride is the first El Loco model built by manufacturer S&S Worldwide (now S&S – Sansei Technologies) of Logan, Utah. The ride was installed by Ride Entertainment Group.

Steel Hawg was expected to open in mid May, but was rescheduled for an early July opening.

Steel Hawg opened to the public on July 5, 2008. The ride contains a 111 degree drop, two inversions, and several twists and turns. It also includes the world's first "outside" turn, meaning you bank to the left and turn right, or vice versa.

Whilst it was originally planned that Steel Hawg would have a 120° drop, the design was simplified such that the drop is just 111°.  The media and advertisement companies were not informed, and the original figure of 120° was used in promotional material.

Steel Hawg was the world's steepest rollercoaster prior to the opening of Mumbo Jumbo, on July 4, 2009, at Flamingo Land, United Kingdom.  Mumbo Jumbo is also an S&S El Loco; it has a 112° drop.  It still had the third steepest drop of all coasters in North America, exceeded only by Cannibal at Lagoon in Utah, which has a 116° drop and TMNT Shellraiser, at Nickelodeon Universe in New Jersey, which has a 121.5° drop.

Steel Hawg was featured in Travel Discoveries "Extreme Terror Rides 2."  It was the tallest coaster at the park, and ranked 22 on travel Channel's 101 greatest thrills.

Steel Hawg can run up to 4 trains at a time, but the park typically chooses to run only 1 or 2 due to limited attendance.

References

External links
Extreme Terror Rides 2

Roller coasters in Indiana
Roller coasters introduced in 2008